Malachi Fitzgerald Jones (born March 22, 1994) is an American gridiron football wide receiver who is currently a free agent. He played college football at Appalachian State.

Early life
Jones attended Central Gwinnett High School in Lawrenceville, Georgia.

Rated a two-star prospect by Rivals.com & a three-star by Scout.com. Led Gwinnett County with 82 receptions, 1,059 receiving yards, 14 touchdowns & 12.9 yards per catch in 2011. Received second-team all-state and first-team all-county recognition in 2011. Participated in the 2010 RisingSeniors.com Georgia Junior Bowl. Broke school and county records for receptions (15) & receiving yards (276) in a game & receptions in a season (82). Coached by Todd Wofford.

Jones committed to Appalachian State University on January 22, 2012. Jones chose Appalachian State over football scholarships from Chattanooga, Georgia Southern, Louisiana–Monroe & Presbyterian.

College career
Jones played four seasons for the Appalachian State Mountaineers of Appalachian State University.

Jones caught 124 passes for 1,711 yards and eight touchdowns in four seasons at Appalachian State. Appeared in all 49 games during his Mountaineer career and made 35 starts at wide receiver.

Earned Freshman All-America recognition from College Sports Journal & named to Southern Conference’s All-Freshman team in 2012.

College statistics
Source:

Professional career
Jones was rated the 83rd best wide receiver in the 2016 NFL Draft by NFLDraftScout.com.

Atlanta Falcons
Jones signed a free agent deal with the Atlanta Falcons of the National Football League (NFL) following the 2016 NFL Draft, but was waived after rookie mini camp.

High Country Grizzlies
Jones signed with the High Country Grizzlies of the National Arena League (NAL). Jones caught 66 passes for 685 yards and 16 touchdowns in 10 games, and was awarded the 2017 National Arena League Offensive Rookie of the Year.

Atlanta Havoc
For 2018, Jones signed with the Atlanta Havoc (now the Carolina Havoc) of the newly formed American Arena League, but departed after one game to join the AFL.

Albany Empire
Jones was assigned to the Albany Empire of the Arena Football League (AFL) for 2018. In 12 regular season games, Jones had 77 receptions for 1,156 yards and 29 touchdowns along with 5 rushing touchdowns. Jones scored at least once in every game played, and passed the 100 yards receiving mark in a game on four occasions during the regular season. He won the 2018 Arena Football League Rookie of the Year Award and Wide Receiver of the Year, becoming the only rookie in league history to win both awards in the same season. Jones was also recognized with First-team All Arena honors for 2018. For the postseason, Albany played in two playoff games, where Jones surpassed the century mark in each of these, and caught 7 more touchdowns. Jones left his day job in marketing to play in the AFL.

Chicago Bears
On July 26, 2018, Jones signed with the Chicago Bears. He was waived on September 1, 2018.

Atlanta Legends
In October 2018, Jones signed with the Atlanta Legends of the Alliance of American Football (AAF).

Jones finished the 2019 season with 22 receptions for 312 yards and 2 touchdowns through 8 games. This was good enough to be ranked 10th in AAF's receiving yards and tied for 6th in touchdown catches. Jones also had two carries for 16 yards.

Second stint with Empire
After the AAF suspended football operations, Jones re-signed with the Albany Empire of the AFL on April 10, 2019. For the first game of the year, Jones contributed to the win with 11 catches for 94 yards and a score. After recording back to back games with over 100 receiving yards and 2 touchdowns, Jones was suspended so that he could work out with the Tennessee Titans of the NFL. Jones did not miss a game, having been reinstated in time for a 10 catch, 179 yard and 3 touchdown performance in week 4 to keep Albany undefeated. It was not until Jones' streak of 5 games with 100 yards receiving was broken that the Empire had their first loss of the season. In 12 regular season games, Jones had 9 games with at least 100 yards receiving, and continued his streak of scoring at least once in every game of the regular season. He finished with 1,440 yards and 25 touchdown catches; Jones was the only AFL receiver with at least 1,000 yards in 2019, a year which culminated in Jones and the Empire winning ArenaBowl XXXII.

Montreal Alouettes
In October 2019, Jones was selected in the 10th round (74th overall) by the Seattle Dragons in the Skills Portion of the 2020 XFL Draft.

Jones did not sign with the XFL, and instead signed a two-year contract with the Montreal Alouettes of the Canadian Football League on December 4, 2019. He was placed on the retired list by the team on June 22, 2021, after receiving a job offer from Lululemon.

Third stint with Empire
Jones signed with the relaunched Albany Empire of the National Arena League on June 17, 2021.

Carolina Cobras
On July 14, 2022, Jones signed with the Carolina Cobras of the National Arena League (NAL).

Career statistics

National Arena League

Arena Football League

Playoffs

Alliance of American Football

Personal life
His father, Andre Jones, was a starting defensive end on the 1988 Notre Dame Fighting Irish football team. He was drafted in the 7th round of the 1991 NFL Draft by the Pittsburgh Steelers. He also played for the Detroit Lions and the Winnipeg Blue Bombers of the Canadian Football League (CFL).

His older brother, T. J. Jones, a former Notre Dame football player, was drafted by the Detroit Lions during the 2014 NFL Draft. His other younger brother, Jahmai Jones, who was drafted by the Angels as the 70th overall pick in the 2nd round of the 2015 MLB Draft, played for the Los Angeles Angels of Major League Baseball (MLB).

Jones’s godfather, Raghib "Rocket" Ismail, finished second in voting for the 1990 Heisman Trophy at Notre Dame and recorded over 5,000 receiving yards in nine NFL seasons.

References

External links
Appalachian State Mountaineers bio

1994 births
Living people
African-American players of American football
African-American players of Canadian football
Albany Empire (AFL) players
American expatriate sportspeople in Canada
American football wide receivers
American players of Canadian football
Appalachian State Mountaineers football players
Atlanta Legends players
Canadian football wide receivers
Chicago Bears players
High Country Grizzlies players
Montreal Alouettes players
People from Lawrenceville, Georgia
Players of American football from Georgia (U.S. state)
Sportspeople from the Atlanta metropolitan area
21st-century African-American sportspeople